Rotherham is a large minster and market town in South Yorkshire, England. It is the main town within the metropolitan borough which is named after the town. Rotherham takes its name from the River Rother, one of two major rivers to flow through the town.  The other being the River Don which meanders through the town centre.  Devolved public transport powers lay with the South Yorkshire Mayoral Combined Authority. 

Traditional industries included farming, glass making and flour milling. Most around the time of the industrial revolution, it was also known as a coal mining town as well as a major contributor to the steel industry.

The town's historic county is Yorkshire and Rotherham formed part of the until 1974. A reorganisation of local government saw the West Riding of Yorkshire administrative county abolished  and the creation of South Yorkshire, made up of four metrpolitan boroughs; named after Barnsley, Doncaster, Rotherham and Sheffield respectively. 

The town had a population of 109,691 in the 2011 census.

History

Early history
Iron Age and Roman settlements are known in the area covered by the district. This includes a small Roman fort to the south-west in the upper flood meadow of the Don at Templeborough. 
 
Rotherham was founded in the very early Middle Ages. Its name is from Old English hām 'homestead, estate', meaning 'homestead on the Rother'. The river name is of Brittonic origin for 'main river', ro- 'over, chief' and duβr 'water'. Another river that also came to be called the Rother is in East Sussex. The Anglo-Saxon settlement, with an ecclesiastical parish, was established on a Roman road's ford over the River Don and the area around it.

The 1086 Domesday Book records a manor previously held by lord Hakon in 1066 tenanted by William the Conqueror's half-brother, Robert de Mortain. The 1086 record shows an absentee lord who held the most inhabited manor, Nigel Fossard.  Today's town area also includes eight outlying Domesday estates. Eight adult male householders were counted as villagers, three were smallholders and one the priest, three ploughlands were tilled by one lord's plough team and two and a half men's plough teams were active. The manor also had a church, roughly four acres of meadow and seven woodland acres. Rotherham had a mill valued at half a pound sterling.

Nigel Fossard's successors, the De Vesci family, rarely visited the town and did not build a castle.  However, they maintained a Friday market and a fair. In the mid 13th century, John de Vesci and Ralph de Tili gave all their possessions in Rotherham to Rufford Abbey. It was part of a period of growing wealth for the church. The monks collected tithes from the town and gained rights to an extra market day on Monday and to extend the annual fair from two to three days.

The townsmen of Rotherham formed the "Greaves of Our Lady's Light", an organisation which worked with the town's three guilds. It was suppressed in 1547 but revived in 1584 as the feoffees of the common lands of Rotherham, and remains in existence.

In the 1480s the Rotherham-born Archbishop of York, Thomas Rotherham, instigated the building of a College of Jesus or Jesus College, Rotherham to rival the colleges of Cambridge and Oxford. It was the first brick building in what is now South Yorkshire and taught theology, religious chant and hymns, grammar and writing.

The college and new parish church of All Saints made Rotherham an enviable and modern town at the turn of the 16th century. The college was dissolved in 1547 in the reign of Edward VI, its assets stripped for the crown to grant to its supporters. Very little remains of the original building in College Street. Walls of part of the College of Jesus are encased within number 23 and Nos 2, 2A, 4 (later for a time Old College Inn, a beerhouse), 6 and 8 Effingham Street. A doorway was rescued from the demolition and relocated to nearby Boston Park in 1879. Fragments of walls are the earliest surviving brick structure in South Yorkshire and are remains of the key institution to Rotherham's growth into a town of regional significance. Sixty years after the college's dissolution Rotherham was described by a wealthy visitor as falling from a fashionable college town to having admitted gambling and vice. The history of Thomas Rotherham and education in the town are remembered in the name of Thomas Rotherham College.

Industrial Revolution
The region had been exploited for iron since Roman times, but it was coal that first brought the Industrial Revolution to Rotherham. Exploitation of the coal seams was the driving force behind the improvements to navigation on the River Don, which eventually formed the Sheffield and South Yorkshire Navigation system of navigable inland waterways.

In the early Industrial Revolution major uses of iron demanded good local ore and established processing skills for iron strength, qualities found in Rotherham's smelting plants and foundries. Iron, and later steel, became the principal industry in Rotherham, surviving into the 20th century. The Walker family built an iron and steel empire in the 18th century, their foundries producing high quality cannon, including some for the ship of the line HMS Victory, and cast iron bridges, one of which was commissioned by Thomas Paine.

Rotherham's cast iron industry expanded rapidly in the early 19th century, the Effingham Ironworks, later Yates, Haywood & Co, opened in 1820. Other major iron founders included William Corbitt and Co; George Wright and Co of Burton Weir; Owen and Co of Wheathill Foundry; Morgan Macauley and Waide of the Baths Foundry; the Masbro' Stove Grate Co belonging to Messrs. Perrot, W. H. Micklethwait and John and Richard Corker of the Ferham Works. G & WG Gummer Ltd exported brass products across the world, supplying fittings for hotels, hospitals, Turkish baths and the RMS Mauretania. Their fittings could also be found on five battleships used in World War II and HMS Ark Royal.

The Parkgate Ironworks was established in 1823 by Sanderson and Watson, and changed ownership several times. In 1854, Samuel Beal & Co produced wrought iron plates for Isambard Kingdom Brunel's famous steamship the SS Great Eastern. In 1864, the ironworks was taken over by the Parkgate Iron Co. Ltd, becoming the Park Gate Iron and Steel Company in 1888. The company was purchased by Tube Investments Ltd in 1956 and closed in 1974. Steel, Peech and Tozer's massive Templeborough steelworks (now the Magna Science Adventure Centre) was, at its peak, over a mile (1.6 km) long, employing 10,000 workers, and housing six electric arc furnaces producing 1.8 million tonnes of steel a year. The operation closed down in 1993.

The first railway stations, Holmes and Rotherham Westgate both on the Sheffield and Rotherham Railway opened on 31 October 1838. Holmes station was located close to the works of Isaac Dodds and Son, pioneers in the development of railway technology. Later railway stations included Parkgate and Aldwarke railway station on the Manchester, Sheffield and Lincolnshire Railway, which opened in July 1873, the Parkgate and Rawmarsh railway station on the North Midland Railway and the Rotherham Masborough railway station also on the North Midland Railway.

Rotherham Forge and Rolling Mill occupied an island in the river known as Forge Island. Its managing director was Francis Charles Moss of Wickersley before his death in 1942. The site was later occupied by a Tesco superstore and is set to be the location for a new leisure development with a proposed cinema, food and drink outlets and a hotel.

Joseph Foljambe established a factory to produce his Rotherham plough, the first commercially successful iron plough.

A glass works was set up in Rotherham in 1751, and became Beatson Clark & Co, one of the town's largest manufacturers, exporting glass medicine bottles worldwide. Beatson Clark & Co was a family business until 1961, when it became a public company. The glass works operated on the same site, although the family connection ceased and the company is owned by Newship Ltd, a holding company linked to the industrialist John Watson Newman. It continues to the manufacture glass containers for the pharmaceutical, food and drinks industries. In the 19th century, other successful industries included pottery, brass making and the manufacture of cast iron fireplaces. Precision manufacturing companies in the town include AESSEAL, Nikken Kosakusho Europe, MTL Advanced, MGB Plastics and Macalloy. Rotherham is the location of the Advanced Manufacturing Park (AMP), which is home to a number of world-class companies including Rolls-Royce and McLaren Automotive.

Milling grain into flour was a traditional industry in Rotherham, formerly in the Millmoor area, hence Rotherham United F.C.'s nickname "The Millers". Flour milling continued at the Rank Hovis town mill site on Canklow Road until September 2008. The site of the mill is now a warehousing and distribution facility for local logistics company 4S Distribution.

Enterprise Zone 1983
In 1983 Rotherham became a designated Enterprise Zone with benefits and incentives given to attract new industry and development in the area. Within the first year ten new companies were established within the zone. The former chemical works at Barbot Hall, which had been empty and derelict, was developed into a new industrial estate and named 'Brookside', after Mangham Brook, running alongside it.

Floods of 2007

Rotherham was affected by flooding in the summer of 2007, which caused the closure of central roads, schools, transport services and damaged residential and commercial property, including the Parkgate Shopping complex and the Meadowhall Centre, which suffered considerable internal water damage. Ulley Reservoir caused major concern and forced the evacuation of thousands of homes when its dam showed signs of structural damage, threatening to break and release water into the suburbs of Treeton, Brinsworth and Canklow as well as potentially flooding the Junction 33 electrical sub-station. Rother FM evacuated its studios, passing its frequency temporarily to neighbouring station Trax FM. A stretch of the M1 motorway was closed for three days owing to the flood risk in the event of a breach of the reservoir. Fire service and police officers used thirteen high-powered pumps to lower the water level in the reservoir and reduce pressure on the dam wall, which was damaged but held. By summer 2008, the reservoir and surrounding country park reopened.

A new wetland and flood storage area, Centenary Riverside park, has since been built by Rotherham Council and the Environment Agency to prevent flooding in the future. The Wildlife Trust for Sheffield and Rotherham manages the site as a local nature reserve. The site is home to the massive sculpture Steel Henge, a Stonehenge replica which is in fact made from iron ingots.

Child sexual exploitation scandal

Following a 2012 article published in The Times alleging the cover-up of organised, large-scale sexual abuse of young children by gangs of people of Pakistani origin in Rotherham, Rotherham Council commissioned Professor Alexis Jay, a former chief social work adviser to the Scottish government, to lead an independent inquiry about the handling of the cases and a suspected child exploitation network. She issued an exploitation report stretching beyond police-level investigated cases. Her report of August 2014 revealed an unprecedented scale of reported child sexual abuse within an urban area of this size over a 16-year period. Subsequently, Eric Pickles, the Secretary of State for Communities and Local Government, commissioned Louise Casey to conduct a Best Value investigation of Rotherham Council. She issued a report of her findings in February 2015.
 
Both reports stated that a majority of the known perpetrators were of Pakistani heritage, and reported a denial of severity which was to a large extent the responsibility of Councillors. Casey's report concluded that at the time of her inspection the council was not fit for the purpose, and identified some necessary measures for preventing further repetition. On 4 February 2015, after receiving Casey's report, Pickles said that commissioners would be appointed to run the council pending new elections, and the council leader and cabinet resigned en masse to allow for a 'fresh start'. The National Crime Agency was called in to investigate whether Rotherham councillors were complicit in hiding the depth and scale of the child abuse (the figure of 1,400 children is now said to be conservative) due to a "fear of losing their jobs and pensions" following a concern that they might be considered "racist" if they spoke out. Also, according to the new report, the councillors were driven by "political correctness".

Jayne Senior, a former youth town worker, was reported to have worked for more than a decade to expose rampant child sexual abuse in Rotherham, but she was met with "indifference and scorn". Senior was awarded an MBE in the 2016 Birthday Honours.

Landmarks

All Saints Minster, on a square of the same name, was built using neat-cut pieces made of a unique sandstone, Rotherham Red, with a low-pitchEd lead roofing. It is a listed building in the highest category of architecture, Grade I. A Belfry was added to the church in 1501 and today the Minster houses 13 bells. A church has stood on the site since before the Norman Conquest and the current building dates from the 15th century and includes parts from earlier Saxon and Norman structures. Clayton and Bell working to George Gilbert Scott's designs constructed the east window. Stained glass makers and designers A. Gibbs, Camm Brothers, Heaton, Butler and Bayne and James Bell are known makers of the other windows. Gargoyles flank its clock on each face. It has a "recessed octagonal spire with crocketed arrises and pinnacled shafts rising from corner faces and a gilded weathervane." Architectural critics Nikolaus Pevsner and Simon Jenkins considered it "the best perpendicular [style] church in the country" and "the best work in the county", respectively.

Close to the town centre is the 15th-century Chapel of Our Lady of Rotherham Bridge (or "Chapel on the Bridge"), beside Chantry Bridge (a road bridge opened in the 1930s). It is one of four surviving bridge chapels in the country. The chapel was restored in 1923, having been used as the town jail and a tobacconist's shop.

The town was once home to Jesus College which was founded by Thomas Rotherham in the fifteenth century. The remains of the college's buildings are in the town centre, some of the earliest examples of a brick built structure remain although not accessible to the public. The gate to the College of Jesus can be found in nearby Boston Park. 
Boston Castle, in the grounds of Boston Park, was built as a hunting lodge by Thomas Howard, 3rd Earl of Effingham between 1773 and 1774 to mark his opposition to British attempts to crush the Americans in their war for independence. It is named after Boston, Massachusetts, the scene of the Boston Tea Party.

Built in the 18th century, Clifton House houses Clifton Park Museum.

On the outskirts of Rotherham, a brick-built glass making furnace, the Catcliffe Glass Cone, is the oldest surviving structure of its type in Western Europe and one of four remaining in the United Kingdom – the others being the Red House Cone in the Wordsley centre of the Dudley Glassworks in the West Midlands, Lemington Glass Works west of Newcastle upon Tyne and Alloa in Scotland. Threatened with demolition in the 1960s, it has been preserved as a Scheduled Ancient Monument and stands as a focal point in a sheltered housing complex and close to the path leading up the Rother valley.

South of Maltby in the east of the district, half-way to Worksop are the ruins of Roche Abbey, among the small minority in the United Kingdom bearing multi-storey walls, as most others are no more than foundations or a single storey of ruins following the dissolution of the monasteries in the 1530s.

Education

Rotherham has three further education institutions and colleges. These are Thomas Rotherham College, Dearne Valley College and the Rotherham College of Arts and Technology. The Rotherham College of Arts and Technology has a campus in the Rotherham town centre and a second site in Dinnington, as well as a nearby, smaller campus for the construction-based subjects taught, such as bricklaying.

Governance

Local governance
Between 1889 to 1974, Rotherham was divided into the County Borough and Urban Districts and Rural Districts which were overseen by the County of York, West Riding. 

The Labour Party, have controlled the authority since the 1974 incorporation of the Metropolitan Borough. Following the 2016 CSE Scandal, the way in which local councillors are elected in Rotherham changed, replacing rolling elections, held annually with whole council elections. This change also coincided with notable boundary changes, which has marked a notable change in the political landscape of the borough. Rotherham's shadow cabinet local opposition is currently the Conservative Party with 18  the seats. Independent(s) account for one seat. 

Although Labour retained control of the council, the Conservatives went from zero to 20 seats at the May 2021 election.
Having had elections by thirds every other year. The method of election is changing to whole council elections every four years, from 2016.

In 2013, Professor Alexis Jay published a report about the Rotherham child sexual exploitation scandal (1997–2013). Following the report's publication, the council leader, Roger Stone of the Labour Party, resigned – an act of contrition the report said should have been made years earlier – saying he would take full responsibility for "the historic failings described so clearly in the report." Labour Councillors Gwendoline Russell, Shaukat Ali and former council leader Roger Stone were suspended from the Labour Party, as was former Deputy Council Leader Jahangir Akhtar, who had lost his council seat in 2014. Chief Executive, Martin Kimber, said no council officers would face disciplinary action. Kimber announced on 8 September that he intended to step down in December 2014, and offered his "sincere apology to those who were let down". The council's director of children's services, Joyce Thacker, also left the authority by mutual agreement. Malcolm Newsam was appointed as Children's Social Care Commissioner in October 2014, and subsequently Ian Thomas was appointed as interim director of children's services.

Shaun Wright, the Police and Crime Commissioner (PCC) for South Yorkshire from 2012, was the Labour councillor in charge of child safety at the council for five years from 2005 to 2010. He initially refused demands to resign as PCC from the Home Secretary, Theresa May, as well as members of his own party and local Labour MP Sarah Champion, saying: "I believe I am the most appropriate person to hold this office at this current time." He resigned from the Labour Party on 27 August 2014, after an ultimatum by the party to either resign or face suspension from the party. Wright stood down as PCC on 16 September, saying that the prominence given to his role distracted from "the important issue, which should be everybody's focus – the 1,400 victims outlined in the report – and in providing support to victims and bringing to justice the criminals responsible for the atrocious crimes committed against them."

The former Chief Constable, Meredydd Hughes, who served from 2004 to 2011 and who had unsuccessfully stood for the Labour Party nomination in the Police Crime Commissioner elections, was told by Labour MP Keith Vaz that he had 'failed' abuse victims.

The inspector, Louise Casey aided by seven assistant inspectors produced the Inspection Report on 4 February 2015. Following its conclusion that the council was not fit for purpose the minister directed that the powers of the council (RMBC) be transferred to his department and the cabinet would need to resign unless RMBC made sufficient representations within 14 days to contradict the report. The Secretary of State empowered a team of five Commissioners to replace councillors before a full election in 2016 and on the Report's strength, stated that as the authority was not currently fit for purpose its powers would not revert until the dis-empowered councillors could prove their fitness to carry out all of the council's duties without intervention. One of these commissioners was appointed to specialise in child protection.

Representation in the national legislature
The Metropolitan Borough of Rotherham covers the constituencies of Rotherham (UK Parliament constituency) which has been held by the Labour Party since 1933; Wentworth and Dearne (UK Parliament constituency), held since labour from the creation of the seat in 1983; and Rother Valley (UK Parliament constituency), held by the Conservatives since the 2019 General Election, this marked the first time the Rother Valley Constituency changed colour since its inception in 1918 and first time the borough of Rotherham that anything other than a Labour MP was returned to Parliament since 1931.

Like most of South Yorkshire, the Rotherham constituencies are considered to be 'safe', that is having enjoyed 'substantial' majorities over a 'long' period of time; a typecast which heightens the incumbency factor present in first past the post elections. The constituency of Rotherham, which includes all its near suburbs, has been held by Labour MPs since a by-election in 1933. After the resignation and subsequent jailing of Denis MacShane in November 2012 due to expenses abuse. The by-election in 2012 saw Sarah Champion elected.

Geography

The Rother here is between 32 and 34 metres above sea level. The south scarp here is slightly higher still, the Canklow Hill Earthworks, a Scheduled Ancient Monument, one of relatively few in the borough, as pre-dating recorded history.

Rotherham's commercial town centre occupies the valley in between these hills on the navigable part of the River Don flowing from the south-west after it has turned approximately due north. The Mid Don Valley continues adjoining towns in the north of the Metropolitan Borough.

Beyond the town centre and away from the Don Valley, the Rotherham district is largely rural, containing a mixture of retired people, larger properties, some farming and tourism and the landscaped Wentworth Woodhouse estate, where the last surviving kiln of the Rockingham Pottery can be seen.

Aside from two regular roads and two bypasses (one being the motorway network), Sheffield is connected directly by the Trans Pennine Trail which passes the Meadowhall shopping centre on both sides (which between the two places) as it includes Sheffield as southern detour.

Rotherham Central station has frequent trains connecting to Sheffield in a time of 14 minutes; Manchester through a change in Sheffield is accessible in a similar circa 70 minutes to nearer Leeds and York as many towns and suburbs in South Yorkshire and West Yorkshire are all stops on Rotherham's railway – it is Doncaster which has the East Coast Main Line providing express intercity services.

Green belt

Rotherham is within a green belt region that extends into the wider surrounding counties, and is in place to reduce urban sprawl, prevent the towns in the Sheffield built-up area conurbation from further convergence, protect the identity of outlying communities, encourage brownfield reuse, and preserve nearby countryside. This is achieved by restricting inappropriate development within the designated areas, and imposing stricter conditions on permitted building.

The green belt surrounds the Rotherham urban area, with larger outlying towns and villages within the borough such as Treeton, Swallownest and Thurcroft also exempted. However, smaller villages, hamlets and rural areas such as Morthen, Ulley, Guilthwaite, Hooton Roberts and Old Ravenfield are 'washed over', so minimising unsuitable development in these.

A subsidiary aim of the green belt is to encourage recreation and leisure interests, with rural landscape features, greenfield areas and facilities including the Wentworth Woodhouse estate and temple, River Rother, northern portions of the River Don and Hooton Brook, Pinch Mill Brook, several golf courses, Ulley reservoir, Herringthorpe allotments, Rotherham Roundwalk and Sheffield Country Walk/Trans-Pennine trails, Thurcroft Hall, and Valley Park.

Demography
In 2011, Rotherham had a population of 109,691, this figure is for an urban subdivision and roughly corresponds with ward and output area boundaries. The population in 2001 was 117,262 but the figure includes Catcliffe which was a separate subdivision a decade later, so there may not have been an actual decrease in population.

The population of Rotherham is increasing slightly because 110,550 people lived in the town in 2014.

In 2011, 14.4% of Rotherham's population were non-white compared with 8.1% for the surrounding borough. Rotherham town has over double the percentage of Asian people compared with the Metropolitan Borough of Rotherham and a slightly larger percentage of black people.

Culture and attractions

Museums

The Magna Science Adventure Centre, an interactive science and adventure centre built in a former steel works in Templeborough, has become one of the most popular tourist destinations in the region.

Clifton Park Museum medium-sized museum in Clifton Park. Admission is free.

Entertainment
The Civic Theatre and an Arts Centre is in the town centre.

The Westgate district of the town centre is the focal point of Rotherham's nightlife.

In 2019, work began on the former Tesco site on forge island to build a multiplex cinema, 4 restaurants, new urban public space and a hotel. The project, first mooted in the early 2000s has experienced many delays and is now scheduled open in 2024, more than 20 years after the scheme was proposed.

Events
Rotherham holds several public events through the year:- A fashion show Rotherham Rocks in July, takes place in 'All Saints Square' and Rotherham by the Sea, in August, is held in Clifton Park, which is transformed into a seaside beach with sand, deckchairs and other traditional seaside attractions. Rotherham Show is an annual event, held in Clifton Park, with stalls from all sectors of the community, shows and live bands in September. The Rotherham Real & Music Festival hosted at the Magna Centre, is one of the UK's largest Real Ale festivals, and typically hosted over 4 days.

In 2016 Rotherham's first carnival took place. The People's Parade which included over 400 people including costumes from Rampage, Luton – Batala a 50 piece Brazilian samba band and hundreds of local people, schools and community groups. The parade lead to a festival in the park with flags, decor 'Eh Up Rotherham' sign, rides, stalls Djs and bands, workshops and activities.

In 2022, Rotherham played host to the UEFA Women's Championship, hosting several games at the New York Stadium.

Parks
Clifton Park, in the town centre is a large park and also includes sport facilities, an outdoor paddling pool, a small fairground and an adventure park. It has been voted and nominated several times over the past few years for numerous awards. The park also holds several events annually including the great Rotherham show and annual fireworks display which both attract thousands of people each year.

Minster Gardens is an urban park in the heart of the town centre, next to Rotherham Minster and All Saints Square. It has an amphitheatre and space for open-air events, with stepped seating, lawns, grass terracing and a meadow area.

Music
Rotherham has several Brass band clubs. It has also produced many classic and progressive rock bands, supported by the Classic Rock Society, such as Jive Bunny, Bring Me the Horizon, and Morris Minor and the Majors.

Shopping
Rotherham town centre has various chain stores including Tesco Extra. Following the availability of "Vitality Grants" from 2009 onwards, a number of new independent businesses opened in the town centre such as Yella Brick Road. In 2015, Rotherham won the Great British High Street award for its independent town centre shopping. Judges praised the transformation of key properties and the restoration of its "historic core". A plaque commemorating the award was unveiled by Secretary of State for Local Government & Committees Sajid Javid MP in September 2016. As of 2021 the majority of the retail in Rotherham is made up of a thriving independent scene with lots of new start up businesses opening in the town centre. Due to the close proximity of Sheffield City Centre, Meadowhall shopping centre and the towns Parkgate Retail Park Rotherham has struggled to attract major brands. Despite hopes by the Council to establish the town centre as an Independent Alternative, many units within the town centre remain vacant, or have been demolished.

In film, art and literature

In film

Chef-writer Jamie Oliver's television series Jamie's Ministry of Food (2008) was based in Rotherham. He aimed to make Rotherham "the culinary capital of the United Kingdom" by his 'Pass it on' scheme, teaching groups some of which went on to work in restaurants. The project closed in 2017. 

The Arctic Monkeys' song "Fake Tales of San Francisco" has a tribute line: "Yeah I'd love to tell you all my problem. You're not from New York City, you're from Rotherham".

The 2013 film Five Pillars was largely set and filmed in Rotherham, which is also the hometown of the writer and director.

Sport

Football

For the 2022–23 season, the town's association football team, Rotherham United, will play in the EFL Championship, the second tier of English Football. The team currently plays at the New York Stadium. Historically the town was represented by Rotherham Town, and Rotherham County, who both played in the Football League.

Rugby
Rotherham Titans rugby union team reached the Guinness Premiership in 1999 and 2003 before being relegated. The club plays at the Clifton Lane Sports Ground. The town is also represented in rugby league by the Rotherham Giants of the Rugby League Conference.

Cricket
Rotherham Town Cricket Club is an English amateur cricket club with a history dating back to 1846. The club ground is based on Clifton Lane. The club have 2 Saturday senior XI teams that compete in the Yorkshire Cricket Southern Premier League, and a junior training section that play competitive cricket in the Sheffield and District Junior League.

Motor Racing
Former Formula One team Virgin Racing were based in Dinnington in the borough. IndyCar and former ChampCar and Formula One driver Justin Wilson was from Woodall, which is in the Metropolitan Borough of Rotherham. Motorcycle speedway racing was staged in the town about 1930.

Greyhound racing
Three greyhound racing tracks existed in or around the town. They were Rotherham Greyhound Stadium (1933-1974); around Millmoor (1930-1933) and in Hellaby. The racing was independent (not affiliated to the sports governing body the National Greyhound Racing Club) and all three tracks were known as flapping tracks, which was the nickname given to independent tracks.

Notable sports persons
Hurdler Chris Rawlinson, Olympic gold medallist sailor Paul Goodison, Olympic silver medallist Peter Elliott, former England goalkeeper David Seaman, golfer Danny Willett and 2010 FIFA World Cup Final referee Howard Webb are all from Rotherham.

Freedom of the Borough

Individuals
 Gavin Walker : 12 January 2022.

Military Units
 On Monday 3 August 2009 Rotherham became the first town to bestow the Freedom of the Borough on the Yorkshire Regiment, giving it the right to march through the town with "flags flying, bands playing and bayonets fixed". At a ceremony outside Rotherham Town Hall, the Regiment paraded two Guards of soldiers who had recently returned from Iraq and the Colours of the 3rd Battalion Yorkshire Regiment (Duke of Wellington's), led by the Kings Division Band, under the command of Lieutenant Colonel Vallings, the battalion commanding officer. The Mayor of Rotherham, Councillor Shaukat Ali, on behalf of the borough, presented the Freedom Scroll to Colonel Simon Newton, who accepted the honour for the regiment. The regiment is the only military unit to become Honorary Freemen of the Borough.

Notable people

Rotherham is the hometown of the Chuckle Brothers, Arsenal and England goalkeeper David Seaman along with World Cup and English Premier League referee Howard Webb. Sean Bean began his acting career in Rotherham while actors Liz White, Ryan Sampson, Dean Andrews and Darrell D'Silva also hail from Rotherham, as does former leader of the Conservative Party, William Hague, and Sir Donald Coleman Bailey. Presenter James May grew up in Rotherham. His co-presenter on Top Gear Jeremy Clarkson trained to be a journalist at the Rotherham Advertiser.

Comedians Sandy Powell and Duggie Brown were born in Rotherham, as was actress Lynne Perrie. Christopher Wolstenholme of Muse, DJ Kritikal Mass, Dean Andrews of Life on Mars, artist Margaret Clarkson, band Jive Bunny & The Mastermixers, musician Rebecca Taylor and singer-actor Rob McVeigh were all born or mostly raised in Rotherham.

Twin towns
Rotherham's official twin towns are:
 Saint-Quentin, Aisne, France

Partner towns
Rotherham has three partner towns:
 Cluj-Napoca, Romania
 Riesa, Germany
 Zabrze, Poland

See also

Listed buildings in Rotherham (Boston Castle Ward)
Rotherham Tramway
Trolleybuses in Rotherham

References

Further reading

Rotherham Timeline
Rotherham Greats

External links

Rotherham Metropolitan Borough Council
Boston Castle, Rotherham, website

 
Towns in South Yorkshire
Unparished areas in South Yorkshire
Geography of the Metropolitan Borough of Rotherham
Folly castles in England